Kamonia is a territory in Kasaï province of the Democratic Republic of the Congo.  Formerly it was named Tshikapa territory.

Territories of Kasaï Province
Tshikapa